Neil Matthews (born 19 September 1966) is an English former football forward who scored 68 goals from 258 appearances in the lower divisions of the Football League. He played for Grimsby Town, Scunthorpe United, Halifax Town, Bolton Wanderers, Stockport County, Lincoln City and Bury, before moving into non-league football. Matthews played in the Football Conference for Dagenham & Redbridge and Leigh RMI, and in the Northern Premier League for Gainsborough Trinity, Guiseley, Leigh RMI and Chorley.

A back problem caused his retirement from playing football in 2001, after which he joined the staff of Huddersfield Town's youth academy.

After working with their youth team, he became Bradford City's Academy Manager in September 2019.

Notes

References

1966 births
Living people
Footballers from Grimsby
English footballers
Association football forwards
Grimsby Town F.C. players
Scunthorpe United F.C. players
Halifax Town A.F.C. players
Bolton Wanderers F.C. players
Stockport County F.C. players
Lincoln City F.C. players
Bury F.C. players
Dagenham & Redbridge F.C. players
Gainsborough Trinity F.C. players
Guiseley A.F.C. players
Leigh Genesis F.C. players
Chorley F.C. players
English Football League players
National League (English football) players
Northern Premier League players
Huddersfield Town A.F.C. non-playing staff
Bradford City A.F.C. non-playing staff